Robert Yim (born February 25, 1985) is a former professional tennis player from the United States.

Yim was given a wildcard into the main draw of the 2003 US Open and lost in straight sets to Todd Martin in the opening round.

References

1985 births
Living people
American male tennis players
Sportspeople from Glendale, California
Tennis people from California